Maydena is a locality in Tasmania, Australia, alongside the River Tyenna.

Maydena is on the Gordon River Road, south west of New Norfolk, through the Bushy Park Hop Fields, turn left at Westerway, past Mount Field National Park and Russell Falls, through Tyenna and Fitzgerald townships and then up to Maydena itself. Gordon River Road continues to Lake Pedder, Lake Gordon and Strathgordon, in the Southwest National Park of Tasmania.
Maydena was formerly called Junee and was a small settlement that provided access to Adamsfield Osmiridium mining in the early 1900s.
In 1947-1950 Australian Newsprint Mills built 100 houses  for the workers of the forestry operations of Australian Newsprint Mill to provide timber for the production of newsprint at their newsprint Mill in Boyer, Tasmania.

At the 1954 Census Maydena had a population of 518 with a further 60 at the Maydena Newsprint Camp. At the 2016 census, Maydena had a population of 222.

Maydena's state primary school and a community online centre have now been closed.

History
The  3 ft 6 in (1,067 mm) gauge railway line in Maydena was once used for hauling timber and osmiridium ore, as well as a way point for the Hydro Electric Commission to build the Gordon River Road to Strathgordon and the construction of the Lake Gordon Dam for the Gordon Power Station, the largest in Tasmania. 
The railway ceased operation in 1991 and a portion of the disused rail track is now being used by a pedal powered 'Railtrack Riders' tourist attraction.
Maydena Post Office opened on 1 May 1944.

Climate 
Maydena has a cool, rainy oceanic climate (Köppen Cfb). Rainfall averaged  annually and an average of 219.3 days of rainfall.

References

External links

Towns in Tasmania